Aquastar is a Swiss watch brand focused on watches for diving and sailing. It was founded in 1962 by Frédéric Robert, a watch designer, scuba diver, and sailor. In 1963, the name of the company Jeanrichard S.A. changed to Aquastar S.A.

History
Aquastar was founded in 1962 in the city of Geneva in Switzerland by Frédéric Robert. Robert,took over the brand JeanRichard from his father and soon changed the name to Aquastar to reflect the idea behind his venture: to create professional grade instruments for divers and aquatic activities.

Aquastar had been awarded numerous patents, based on each patent a new Aquastar family member was born. The inner rotating bezel in the model 63, the multiple dive decompression bezel in the Deepstar, the Benthos and the Regate counter. The new crown sealing system and the friction bezel ring were incorporated in every Aquastar and the regatta counter watches.

Aquastar watches were only available through professional diving equipment outlets and ever offered on a large scale to retail distributors.

In 1974, Robert retired and in 1975, Aquastar was acquired by the Eren Group who then sold it to the Seinet Brothers in 1982. Whilstowned by the Eren group, its mainstream dive and sports watches were made available to the general public through retail outlets. Seinet, an avid sailor and 3rd generation watchmaker, wanted to acquire a watch brand with its facilities and resources and promptly created the Alain Delon wrist watch. Following the realization that traditional mechanical Swiss watches were passed down and no longer appealed to the younger buyers, Aquastar developed and patented an affordable timepiece made of plastic and housing robust quartz movements which marked a new era of commercial success for the brand.

After achieving the necessary commercial success, Mr. Seinet decided to focus on his passion, which is sailing and continued the tradition of Frédéric Robert and created multiple generations of quartz regatta watches between 1983 until 2018.

Product lines
Since its inception, the company has launched a number of product lines. The model 63 was considered a great commercial success for the company and it was for many years the mainstay in Aquastars offerings. It was followed by the creation of the iconic Deepstar and the first Regatta. From that point onward, Aquastar elevated and became a cult company establishing itself as one of the most important specialized watch making companies. The Deepstar was first chronograph of the brand, and probably the most famous Aquastar model. The Deepstar is highly sought after by collectors and it is considered one of the most iconic diver chronographs of all time. The Deepstar demonstrated the design ethos of F. Robert since it was elegant and functional at the same time. Below are the major watches of company:

 Model 60
 Aquastar Atoll
 Aquastar Seatime
 The Deepstar
 Aquastar Regate
 Aquastar Benthos 500
 Aquastar Ethos

References 

Swiss watch brands
Swiss companies established in 1962
Watch manufacturing companies of Switzerland